Bestwick's Market is a  wood-framed false-fronted commercial building located in Alberton, Montana, United States which was listed on the National Register of Historic Places on January 13, 1997.  Constructed in 1910 with additions in 1915 and 1925, the building housed Bestwick's Market from 1912 to the late 1950s.  The building has housed the Montana Valley Book Store since the 1970s.

References
Notes

Commercial buildings on the National Register of Historic Places in Montana
National Register of Historic Places in Mineral County, Montana
Buildings and structures completed in 1910
1910 establishments in Montana
Western false front architecture
Independent bookstores of the United States